, provisional designation: , is a Jupiter trojan from the Greek camp, approximately  in diameter. It was discovered on 15 December 1999, by American astronomer Charles Juels at the Fountain Hills Observatory in Arizona. The dark Jovian asteroid has a short rotation period of 5.72 hours and belongs to the 90 largest Jupiter trojans. It has not been named since its numbering in January 2001.

Orbit and classification 

 is a dark Jovian asteroid orbiting in the leading Greek camp at Jupiter's  Lagrangian point, 60° ahead of the Gas Giant's orbit in a 1:1 resonance . It is also a non-family asteroid in the Jovian background population.

It orbits the Sun at a distance of 4.9–5.5 AU once every 11 years and 11 months (4,352 days; semi-major axis of 5.22 AU). Its orbit has an eccentricity of 0.06 and an inclination of 22° with respect to the ecliptic.

The body's observation arc begins with a precovery published by the Digitized Sky Survey and taken at the Palomar Observatory in February 1953, almost 47 years prior to its official discovery observation at Fountain Hills.

Numbering and naming 

This minor planet was numbered on 9 January 2001. , it has not been named.

Physical characteristics 

 is an assumed, carbonaceous C-type asteroid. It has a high V–I color index of 1.00 (see table below).

Rotation period 

Lightcurve analysis gave a rotation period of  hours with a brightness variation of 0.33 magnitude.

Observations by Stefano Mottola at the Calar Alto Observatory in October 2009 showed a divergent period of 7.631 hours with an amplitude of 0.20 magnitude.

Diameter and albedo 

According to the survey carried out by the NEOWISE mission of NASA's Wide-field Infrared Survey Explorer,  between 50.96 kilometers in diameter and its surface has an albedo of 0.052, while the Collaborative Asteroid Lightcurve Link assumes a standard albedo for a carbonaceous asteroid of 0.057 and calculates a diameter of 46.30 kilometers based on an absolute magnitude of 10.4. The object was neither observed by IRAS nor the Akari satellite.

References

External links 
 Asteroid Lightcurve Database (LCDB), query form (info )
 Discovery Circumstances: Numbered Minor Planets (20001)-(25000) – Minor Planet Center
 Asteroid (20729) 1999 XS143 at the Small Bodies Data Ferret
 
 

020729
20729

19991215